|}

The Oak Tree Stakes is a Group 3 flat horse race in Great Britain open to  fillies and mares aged three years or older. It is run at Goodwood over a distance of 7 furlongs (1,408 metres), and it is scheduled to take place each year in late July or early August.

History
The event was established in 1980, and it was initially called the New Stand Stakes. The inaugural running was the first race at that year's Glorious Goodwood meeting, and it commemorated the opening of a new grandstand at the venue by Queen Elizabeth II.

The race was titled the Royal Wedding Day Stakes in 1981, as it took place on the same day as the wedding of Prince Charles and Diana.

The present registered title, which acknowledges the link between Goodwood and the Oak Tree Racing Association of California, was introduced in 1982. An event called the Goodwood Stakes was staged during the Oak Tree meeting at Santa Anita Park in October but was renamed the Awesome Again Stakes in 2012. The Goodwood race was sponsored by L'Omarins from 2014 to 2018 and named the L'Ormarins Queen's Plate to link the race with the South African race of that name.

For a period the Oak Tree Stakes was classed at Listed level. It was promoted to Group 3 status in 2004.

The race is currently held on the second day of the five-day Glorious Goodwood meeting.

Records

Most successful horse (2 wins):
 Al Jazi - 2016, 2017

Leading jockey (4 wins):
 Steve Cauthen – Fenny Rough (1983), Ever Genial (1985), Gayane (1987), Alidiva (1990)

Leading trainer (6 wins):
 Sir Henry Cecil – Chalon (1982), Ever Genial (1985), Gayane (1987), Alidiva (1990), Selfish (1999), Chachamaidee (2011)

Winners

See also
 Horse racing in Great Britain
 List of British flat horse races

References

 Paris-Turf: 
 Racing Post:

 galopp-sieger.de – Oak Tree Stakes.
 ifhaonline.org – International Federation of Horseracing Authorities – Oak Tree Stakes (2019).
 pedigreequery.com – Oak Tree Stakes – Goodwood.

Flat races in Great Britain
Goodwood Racecourse
Mile category horse races for fillies and mares
Recurring sporting events established in 1980
1980 establishments in England